Jorge Andrés Luna Aguilar (born 26 January 1994) is a Venezuelan professional footballer who plays as a centre-back.

Club career
Born in Acarigua, Luna began his career playing with local youth clubs Conejeros Fútbol Club and Punta de Piedra Fútbol Club before joining Centro Italo. He also played in local youth futsal leagues. In 2010, Luna moved into the youth setup of Primera División club Caracas before moving abroad the next season to Paraguay, joining Guaraní. He stayed with Guaraní for a season before moving to Uruguay and joining Peñarol in 2012 and Liverpool in 2013.

Portuguesa
During the 2013–14 season, Luna returned to Venezuela and joined the local Primera División club Portuguesa. He was promoted into the first-team squad and given his professional debut on 22 November 2014 against Deportivo La Guaira, starting in what would be a 0–1 defeat. Then, during the very next match, Luna scored his first professional goal. On 30 November, his 55th minute goal only served as a consolation in a 1–2 defeat against Zamora.

On 14 February 2016, Luna scored his first goal in over a year against Aragua, a 61st minute equalizer to help the match end in a 2–2 draw. The 2016 season would serve as Luna's breakout season, with him playing in 30 matches and scoring 3 goals. The next season, Luna would play in 24 matches, scoring 2 goals.

Atlético Venezuela
In December 2017, following the previous season, Luna signed with fellow Primera División club Atlético Venezuela. He made his debut for the club on 4 February 2018 against Monagas, starting in the 1–0 victory.

Return to Portuguesa
Following the 2018 season, Luna returned to Portuguesa. He made his debut back with the club on 26 January 2019 against Deportivo Anzoátegui, starting as the club won 2–1.

Glacis United and Sportivo Luqueño
In August 2019, Luna moved to Gibraltar and signed with National League club Glacis United. He stayed with the club for half a year before moving back to Paraguay and signing with Sportivo Luqueño.

Chattanooga Red Wolves
On 10 January 2021, Luna signed with American USL League One club Chattanooga Red Wolves. He made his debut for the club in their season opener on 8 May 2021 against North Texas SC, starting in his club's 1–0 victory.

International career
Luna has represented Venezuela at the under-15 level, playing for the side during a youth tournament in 2009.

Career statistics

References

External links
 Profile at Chattanooga Red Wolves

1994 births
Living people
Venezuelan footballers
Association football defenders
Portuguesa F.C. players
Atlético Venezuela C.F. players
Glacis United F.C. players
Sportivo Luqueño players
Chattanooga Red Wolves SC players
Venezuelan Primera División players
USL League One players
Venezuelan expatriate footballers
Expatriate footballers in Paraguay
Expatriate footballers in Uruguay
Expatriate soccer players in the United States
People from Acarigua